Jordan Weisman is an American game designer, author, and serial entrepreneur who has founded five game design companies, each in a different game genre and segment of the industry.

Biography
Weisman graduated from Francis W. Parker High School, in Chicago, Illinois. He went to the Merchant Marine Academy and briefly attended University of Illinois at Chicago, before leaving school to pursue his business interests.

In 1980, Weisman founded role playing game publisher FASA Corporation (short for the Freedonia Aeronautics & Space Administration, named after the fictional country in the Marx Brothers film Duck Soup) with partner L. Ross Babcock. Weisman and Babcock printed up a few hundred copies of Weisman's early adventures for the pen and paper role-playing game, Traveller, and sold them to a local Chicago store before sending them to nationwide distributors. Although working out of Weisman's basement, he and Babcock were looking for outside talent and brought William H. Keith, Jr. and his brother J. Andrew Keith into the company from GDW. The company's first professional publication was I.S.P.M.V Tethys (1980), a set of deckplans for a mercenary transport, drawn by Weisman and featuring three scenarios written by Andrew Keith. In August 1981, FASA came to an agreement to publish the digest-sized magazine High Passage, on which Weisman and Babcock did the layout and editing. Weisman wanted FASA to produce its own science-fiction roleplaying game, so he and Babcock secured the rights to produce their own 1983 Star Trek: The Role Playing Game. FASA introduced a game about battling mechanoids called Combots (1983), by Weisman and Fawcett. FASA later produced the successful BattleTech and Shadowrun franchises.

In 1987, Weisman and his father Morton Weisman founded Environmental Simulations Project — later renamed Virtual Worlds Entertainment — the company that produced the BattleTech Centers. Working with Incredible Technologies, VWE created the world's first immersive networked location-based virtual reality gaming centers. VWE was a critical, though not a commercial success. As Weisman got more involved in VWE, Sam Lewis became FASA's president.

In 1995, Weisman founded FASA Interactive with Denny Thorley and Morton Weisman to personally take over the development and production of the hit MechWarrior PC games; FASA Corporation (the RPG company) provided FASA Interactive with a license for its properties in return for stock. The franchise is one of the top-selling PC games of all time, with sales of over 9 million units worldwide.

On January 7, 1999, Microsoft acquired Virtual World Entertainment Group and FASA Interactive; VWE was sold off to some of its developers, while FASA Interactive became Microsoft's FASA Studio. Babcock and Weisman went over to Microsoft, with Weisman becoming the Creative Director of Microsoft games from 1999 to 2002. While working at Microsoft, Weisman and his unit created a new genre of interactive entertainment called alternative reality games, and developed the alternate reality game "The Beast", to promote the Steven Spielberg film A.I.

Weisman had been working on a design for a computer game called Corsairs!, set in an alternate universe United States, and he convinced FASA Corporation to develop the board game Crimson Skies (1998) to enhance the value of the property.

In 2000, he founded WizKids, with his new idea for miniatures games involving the "clix" miniature figure that contained a dial to depict the miniature's stats. WizKids produced the games Mage Knight, HeroClix, and Pirates of the Spanish Main. WizKids grew rapidly and went from start-up to over $30M in annual sales in just two years. The company focused on miniature figure games that are easy to learn for younger players. Weisman sold WizKids to Topps in 2003.

In 2003 he founded 42 Entertainment, a design company in the new field of the alternate reality game or ARGs. 42 has created multiple ARGs, including, "I Love Bees", to promote the Xbox game Halo 2, and "Year Zero" to promote the Nine Inch Nails album of the same name.

In 2006, his Cathy's Book, a novel with interactive elements co-written by Sean Stewart and illustrated by Cathy Brigg appeared from Running Press. The book was a best seller in Germany and sold over 100,000 copies in the USA.

In 2007, FASA Studio was dissolved and all of the FASA rights were then licensed to Weisman. In 2007 Weisman founded Smith & Tinker (named after the characters in The Wizard of Oz).  It was through Smith & Tinker that Weisman was able to relicense his old FASA properties. Smith & Tinker licensed the electronic entertainment rights to Crimson Skies, Shadowrun, MechWarrior and other FASA properties that had belonged to Microsoft.

The same year Weisman co-founded the start-up Fyreball with Pete Parsons (formerly of Bungie and currently serves on the Board of Advisors along with Ed Fries).  The company is now operating under the name Meteor Solutions.

On May 27, 2009 Weisman's Smith & Tinker announced their first game had been released to public beta. This was Nanovor, an online battle game targeted to 7-12 year olds. However, it was not a success, and was closed down in December 2010.  Smith & Tinker closed down November 8, 2012.

On June 9, 2009 Weisman and J.C. Hutchins released Personal Effects: Dark Art (Griffin). On the same day Weisman along with Russ Bullock announced that the MechWarrior franchise would be seeing a relaunch.

Jordan is currently an Adjunct Professor in the Interactive Media Division at the USC School of Cinema-Television. In 2012 he started to raise money, through Kickstarter, for Shadowrun Returns, a new video game adaptation of Shadowrun. His new company is Harebrained Schemes and they released their 3rd game Shadowrun Returns on July 25, 2013. Shortly after, on September 10, 2013, Jordan's company launched a Kickstarter for its first tabletop game, Golem Arcana. After successfully funding, Golem Arcana released the following year on August 13, 2014. On January 13, 2015, Harebrained Schemes launched another Kickstarter campaign to partially fund development their next Shadowrun game, Shadowrun: Hong Kong. Shadowrun Returns was in many top 10 lists for 2014 and several No 1s for RPGs that year. Shadowrun Hong Kong was in many top 10s lists in 2015 and several No. 1 RPGs for 2015. In 2015 HBS did a kickstarter for Battletech/MechWarrior another property created by Jordan Weisman. They raised just short of 3 million and the game was released on April 24, 2018.

In June 2018, it was announced and completed Harebrained's acquisition by Paradox Interactive for a fixed purchase price of US$7,500,000.

Awards and honors
Weisman has won more than 100 awards, including election to the Hall of Fame by the Academy of Adventure Gaming Arts & Design. In 2003 he was selected as the Pacific Northwest Entrepreneur of the Year by Ernst & Young.

In 2022, The Peabody Awards announced a new category for digital and interactive storytelling, including legacy awards for notable projects. Weisman won for The Beast, along with Sean Stewart, Pete Fenlon, and Elan Lee.

Design credits
Weisman's design credits in paper RPG and miniature game design include:

 The click base concept for miniature gaming, MageKnight, HeroClix, etc.
 Star Trek III: Starship Combat Game Box Set (1984)
 Battletech (1984)
 Shadowrun (1989) - game concept
 Earthdawn (1993) - game concept
Crimson Skies (1998)
 MechWarrior: Dark Age (2002)
 Aerotech 2, Revised Ed. (BattleTech) (2004)
 Golem Arcana (2014)

He also served as production manager and/or graphic designer on a long series of titles, and is co-author with Sean Stewart of Cathy's Book'', a young-adult novel with ARG components.

References

External links
Harebrained Schemes
Weisman's rap sheet at MobyGames
Escapist Magazine's biography/article on Weisman
John Cook's Venture Blog at SeattlePI.com
 

21st-century American businesspeople
American sailors
20th-century American Jews
American video game designers
Jewish video game developers
1960 births
Living people
Role-playing game designers
21st-century American Jews
Francis W. Parker School (Chicago) alumni